The Eighth cabinet of Kim Kielsen was the Government of Greenland from 8 February 2021 to 23 April 2021. It was a coalition minority government consisting of Siumut and Descendants of Our Country.

The previous cabinet was dissolved on 8 February 2021 when the Democrats left the coalition following disagreement with the new leadership of Siumut over a proposed open-pit mine near the town of Narsaq. An early election was called following the 2021 opening of the national assembly, which was held on 6 April 2021.

List of ministers
Siumut had 6 ministers including the Premier. The Centrist party Descendants of Our Country had 1 minister.

|}

See also 
Cabinet of Greenland

References

Government of Greenland
Coalition governments
Politics of Greenland
Political organisations based in Greenland
Kielsen, Kim VIII
Cabinets established in 2018
2018 in Greenland
Greenland politics-related lists